is a former Japanese football player.

Club statistics

References

External links

1986 births
Living people
Association football people from Tokushima Prefecture
Japanese footballers
J1 League players
Japan Football League players
Nagoya Grampus players
FC Kariya players
Zweigen Kanazawa players
Association football midfielders